Francisco Gelaberti (born 10 August 1935) is an Argentine boxer. He competed in the men's welterweight event at the 1956 Summer Olympics.

References

1935 births
Living people
Argentine male boxers
Olympic boxers of Argentina
Boxers at the 1956 Summer Olympics
Place of birth missing (living people)
Welterweight boxers